Someday My Prince Will Come is a live album by trumpeter/vocalist Chet Baker which was recorded in 1979 at the Jazzhus Montmartre and released on the Danish SteepleChase label.

Track listing 
 "Gnid" (Tadd Dameron) – 8:33 Bonus track on CD release
 "Love Vibrations" (Horace Silver) – 9:51 Bonus track on CD release
 "Sad Walk" (Bob Zieff) – 10:41
 "Someday My Prince Will Come" (Frank Churchill, Larry Morey) – 7:48
 "I'm Old Fashioned" (Jerome Kern, Johnny Mercer) – 7:25
 "In Your Own Sweet Way" (Dave Brubeck) – 10:12

Personnel 
Chet Baker – trumpet, vocals
Doug Raney – guitar
Niels-Henning Ørsted Pedersen – bass

References 

Chet Baker live albums
1983 live albums
SteepleChase Records live albums
Albums recorded at Jazzhus Montmartre